Ulla Agneta Linnéa Mårtensson (born July 31, 1961) is a Swedish former freestyle swimmer. She won a silver medal in 4 × 100 m freestyle relay at the 1980 Summer Olympics in Moscow along with Carina Ljungdahl, Tina Gustafsson and Agneta Eriksson. She also competed in the 1984 Summer Olympics.

Mårtensson was previously married to fellow swimmer and Olympic gold medal winner Bengt Baron.

Personal bests

Long course (50 m)

Clubs
 Karlslunds IF
 SK Korrugal

References
 

1961 births
Living people
Olympic swimmers of Sweden
Swimmers at the 1980 Summer Olympics
Swimmers at the 1984 Summer Olympics
Olympic silver medalists for Sweden
Swedish female freestyle swimmers
Medalists at the 1980 Summer Olympics
Olympic silver medalists in swimming
Sportspeople from Örebro